René Weissinger (born 11 December 1978 in Böblingen) is a German former professional cyclist.

Major results

2000
3rd Grand Prix Waregem
2001
1st  National Hill Climb Championships
2003
3rd National Hill Climb Championships
2004
1st Haid-Ansfelden
3rd National Hill Climb Championships
2005
1st Tour de Berne
1st Völkermarkter Radsporttage
1st GP Voralberg
2006
 Tour of Qinghai Lake
1st Stages 1 & 2
2008
1st  Points classification Tour de Suisse

References

External links

1978 births
Living people
German male cyclists
People from Böblingen
Sportspeople from Stuttgart (region)
Cyclists from Baden-Württemberg